Cooper Avenue Row Historic District is a national historic district in Glendale, Queens, New York.  It includes seven contributing buildings built in 1915.  They consist of two story, flat front brick rowhouse dwellings with one apartment per floor.  They are constructed of yellow brick with burnt orange brick details.  They feature some of Glendale's most striking and elaborate brickwork.

It was listed on the National Register of Historic Places in 1983.

References

Houses completed in 1915
Glendale, Queens
Historic districts on the National Register of Historic Places in Queens, New York